The 7th Women's European Amateur Boxing Championships were held in Mykolaiv, Ukraine from September 15 to 20, 2009.
This edition of the recurring competition was organised by the European governing body for amateur boxing, EUBC.
113 fighters representing 26 federations competed in 11 weight classes, the limits of which had changed since the previous edition of the championships.

Russia topped the medals table (as they had done in the six  previous editions of these championships), although host country Ukraine won more medals in total including 5 bronzes.  victor Sofia Ochigava was voted Best Boxer of the tournament.

Medal table

Medal winners
Source:

References

European Amateur Boxing Championships
Boxing
Women's European Amateur Boxing Championships
International boxing competitions hosted by Ukraine
Sport in Mykolaiv
September 2009 sports events in Europe